Bakumpai is an Austronesian language belonging to the West Barito languages. It is spoken by about 100,000 Bakumpai people (a subgroup of Dayak people) living in the central Kalimantan, Indonesia.

Neighbouring ethnic groups are Banjar people, Ngaju people and Ma'anyan people. Thus there is high lexical similarity with the neighbouring languages (75% with Ngaju language, 45% with Banjar language).

Vocabulary comparison between Bakumpai, Ngaju and Indonesian

References 

West Barito languages
Languages of Indonesia